Marin Stan (born 9 July 1950) is a Romanian sports shooter. He competed at the 1976 Summer Olympics, the 1980 Summer Olympics and the 1984 Summer Olympics.

References

1950 births
Living people
Romanian male sport shooters
Olympic shooters of Romania
Shooters at the 1976 Summer Olympics
Shooters at the 1980 Summer Olympics
Shooters at the 1984 Summer Olympics
People from Alexandria, Romania